Kinesin light chain 2 is a protein that in humans is encoded by the KLC2 gene.

Interactions 

KLC2 has been shown to interact with MAPK8IP3 and KIF5B.

Model organisms 

Model organisms have been used in the study of KLC2 function. A conditional knockout mouse line called Klc2tm1e(EUCOMM)Wtsi was generated at the Wellcome Trust Sanger Institute. Male and female animals underwent a standardized phenotypic screen to determine the effects of deletion. Additional screens performed:  - In-depth immunological phenotyping

References

Further reading